James William Moret (born Ercolani; December 3, 1956) is the chief correspondent for the syndicated television news magazine Inside Edition hosted by Deborah Norville and Mary Calvi. Moret has covered entertainment news and traditional hard news stories for over 25 years.   He is a regular guest contributor, legal analyst and guest-host on CNN, HLN, Fox News Channel, Court TV, and MSNBC. He is the son of actor-singer James Darren and Darren's first wife, Gloria Terlitsky (m. 1955, div. 1959).

Career
Moret is from Los Angeles, California. He graduated from the University of California, Los Angeles, with a degree in Communication Studies and received a J.D. in 1981 when he was 25 years old from Southwestern Law School.

Moret has covered many major California criminal cases including the Night Stalker trial, Billionaire Boys Club murder trial, the O. J. Simpson criminal and civil trials, Scott Peterson double murder trial and the
Michael Jackson molestation case, for which he served as the broadcast legal analyst for numerous television and radio networks.

Before joining Inside Edition, Moret was probably best known for anchoring CNN's coverage of the O. J. Simpson criminal trial in 1995 and hosting the long-running Showbiz Today and co-anchoring The World Today.  After leaving CNN, Moret hosted a series of specials for ABC, and, for three years, co-hosted the Academy Awards pre-show for the network.  He has also been a guest anchor on the KTLA Morning News in Los Angeles, and on Fox 5’s Good Day New York.  His first on-air reporting position was at KABC-TV in Los Angeles.

In 2004, Moret delivered the Commencement Address for the UCLA Department of Communication Studies, after which he was invited to serve as a visiting professor. He is also a graduate of the program. Moret is a member of the California Bar and resides in Los Angeles with his wife Keri and their three children.

Moret's first book is an inspirational memoir entitled The Last Day of My Life, published by Phoenix Books and launched on January 5, 2010.

References

External links
 Inside Edition Bio

Living people
American people of Italian descent
American people of Jewish descent
American television reporters and correspondents
Television anchors from Los Angeles
Place of birth missing (living people)
1956 births
21st-century American memoirists
Writers from Los Angeles
CNN people
University of California, Los Angeles alumni
Southwestern Law School alumni
California lawyers
Inside Edition